Alopoglossus meloi is a species of lizard in the family Alopoglossidae. The species is endemic to northern Brazil.

Etymology
The specific name, meloi, is in honor of André Renato de Melo Teixeira.

Geographic range
A. meloi is found in the state of Pará, Brazil.

Habitat
The preferred habitat of A. meloi is leaf litter in relatively open, dry forest.

References

Further reading
Ribeiro-Júnior MA (2018). "A new species of Alopoglossus lizard (Squamata, Alopoglossidae) from the Southern Guiana Shield, northeastern Amazonia, with remarks on diagnostic characters to the genus". Zootaxa 4422 (1): 025–040. (Alopoglossus meloi, new species). 

Alopoglossus
Reptiles of Brazil
Endemic fauna of Brazil
Reptiles described in 2018
Taxa named by Marco Antônio Ribeiro Jr.